Jim Cant (born 24 September 1953) is an Australian former soccer player.

Playing career

Club career
Cant signed for Hearts Of Midlothian in 1970, from United Crossroads Boys Club, he was farmed out by Hearts of Midlothian to play one season of amateur football for Peebles Rovers for one season, then brought back to Tynecastle to play reserve football, making his first team debut in 1972. Heart of Midlothian. He played 66 league matches for Hearts. Jimmy requested a free transfer late 1976 and eventually got his wish Xmas 1977. Johnny Warren got in touch with Jimmy through Sydney City's coach Gerry Chaldi, Jimmy was mentioned to Gerry Chaldi by Hakoah player John Stevenson, who had played with Jimmy at Hearts.  Jimmy accepted an offer from Johnny Warren, coach for Canberra City 1977, to come to Australia on a 1-year contract.  Jimmy eventually played for Canberra City, Marconi FC and Sydney City and his final playing year 1987, Canberra City for a second spell in the National Soccer League.

International career
In 1983 Cant made his debut for his adopted country. He played 12 matches for Australia, including six in full international matches.

References

1953 births
Australian soccer players
Scottish footballers
Australia international soccer players
Canberra City FC players
Heart of Midlothian F.C. players
Living people
Footballers from Edinburgh
Association football midfielders
Hakoah Sydney City East FC players